Dareh Senji (also Romanized as Dāreh Senjī) is a village in Dasht Rural District, Silvaneh District, Urmia County, West Azerbaijan Province, Iran. At the 2006 census, its population was 108, in 15 families.

References 

Populated places in Urmia County